The 1932 Arkansas Razorbacks football team represented the University of Arkansas in the Southwest Conference (SWC) during the 1932 college football season. In their fourth year under head coach Fred Thomsen, the Razorbacks compiled a 1–6–2 record (1–4 against SWC opponents), finished in last place in the SWC, and were outscored by their opponents by a combined total of 133 to 65.

Schedule

References

Arkansas
Arkansas Razorbacks football seasons
Arkansas Razorbacks football